Matheus Bissi da Silva (born 19 March 1991), known as Matheus Bissi, is a Brazilian footballer who plays as a defensive midfielder or centre back for FC Atyrau. He also holds Portuguese citizenship.

Club career
Bissi made his professional debut in the II liga for Raków Częstochowa on 5 September 2015 in a game against Olimpia Zambrów.

In July 2017, Bissi joined Bulgarian First League club Slavia Sofia.

References

External links
 

1991 births
People from Piracicaba
Living people
Association football midfielders
Association football defenders
Brazilian footballers
Campeonato de Portugal (league) players
First Professional Football League (Bulgaria) players
A Lyga players
II liga players
Maltese Premier League players
Bahraini Premier League players
Clube Náutico Marcílio Dias players
FK Banga Gargždai players
Birkirkara F.C. players
Raków Częstochowa players
G.D. Tourizense players
PFC Slavia Sofia players
FC Stumbras players
Al-Muharraq SC players
FK Panevėžys players
Brazilian expatriate footballers
Brazilian expatriate sportspeople in Lithuania
Expatriate footballers in Lithuania
Brazilian expatriate sportspeople in Malta
Expatriate footballers in Malta
Brazilian expatriate sportspeople in Poland
Expatriate footballers in Poland
Brazilian expatriate sportspeople in Portugal
Expatriate footballers in Portugal
Brazilian expatriate sportspeople in Bulgaria
Expatriate footballers in Bulgaria
Brazilian expatriate sportspeople in Bahrain
Expatriate footballers in Bahrain
Footballers from São Paulo (state)